In algebraic geometry and string theory, the phenomenon of wall-crossing describes the discontinuous change of a certain quantity, such as an integer geometric invariant, an index or a space of BPS state, across a codimension-one wall in a space of stability conditions, a so-called wall of marginal stability.

References
 Kontsevich, M. and Soibelman, Y. "Stability structures, motivic Donaldson–Thomas invariants and cluster transformations" (2008). .
 M. Kontsevich, Y. Soibelman, "Motivic Donaldson–Thomas invariants: summary of results", 
 Joyce, D. and Song, Y. "A theory of generalized Donaldson–Thomas invariants,"  (2008). .
 Gaiotto, D. and Moore, G. and Neitzke, A. "Four-dimensional wall-crossing via three-dimensional field theory" (2008). .
 Mina Aganagic, Hirosi Ooguri, Cumrun Vafa, Masahito Yamazaki, "Wall crossing and M-theory", 
 Kontsevich, M. and  Soibelman, Y., "Wall-crossing structures in Donaldson-Thomas invariants, integrable systems and Mirror Symmetry", 

String theory
Algebraic geometry